= Abayomi Oluyomi =

Nigerian politician

Commissioner for Finance, Lagos State
- Incumbent
- Assumed office 2023

Personal details
- Born: Lagos State, Nigeria
- Education: University of Lagos
- Occupation: Politician

Abayomi Oluyomi is a Nigerian politician from Lagos State, Nigeria. He earned both his Bachelor's and Master's degrees in Finance, Accounting, and Banking from the University of Lagos. In 2023, he was appointed as the Commissioner for Finance, Lagos State. He has also held other political and leadership positions, including serving as a Special Adviser.
